Basivka – village in Lviv Raion, Lviv Oblast in western Ukraine. It belongs to Sokilnyky rural hromada, one of the hromadas of Ukraine.

The population of village is just about 1042 persons and local government is administered by the Hodovytsko-Basivska village council.

Geography 

History 
The first mention of village has been in 1431. 

Then the Polish King Władysław II Jagiełło donated to the Roman Catholic Archdiocese of Lviv 700 hectares of land near the village of Obroshyne.

Until 18 July 2020, Basivka belonged to Pustomyty Raion. The raion was abolished in July 2020 as part of the administrative reform of Ukraine, which reduced the number of raions of Lviv Oblast to seven. The area of Pustomyty Raion was merged into Lviv Raion.

References

External links 
 weather.in.ua Basivka
 с Басівка Львівська область, Пустомитівський район 
 Годовиця Басівка, Сайт громади 

Villages in Lviv Raion